Phyllobaenus scaber is a species of checkered beetle in the family Cleridae. It is found in North America.

References

Further reading

 

Cleridae
Articles created by Qbugbot
Beetles described in 1852